Herbert Donta Haygood (born December 30, 1977) was an American football coach and former player. He played professionally as a wide receiver in the National Football League (NFL). He was drafted by the Denver Broncos in the fifth round of the 2002 NFL Draft. He spent the 2006 season with the Battle Creek Crunch of the Great Lakes Indoor Football League. He played college football at Michigan State University. Haygood coached wide receivers at Miami University from 2011 to 2012. He was the associate director of player personnel at Indiana University. He was the wide receivers coach at Eastern Michigan University. In 2018, He was hired as the inaugural offensive coordinator at Madonna University under head coach Brian Foos, was promoted to interim head coach in late 2020, and was named permanent head coach in March 2021.

Head coaching record

References

External links
 Madonna profile

1977 births
Living people
American football wide receivers
Denver Broncos players
Eastern Michigan Eagles football coaches
Indiana Hoosiers football coaches
Miami RedHawks football coaches
Michigan State Spartans football players
Madonna Crusaders football coaches
Olivet Comets football coaches
Saginaw Valley State Cardinals football coaches
Scottish Claymores players
Sarasota High School alumni
Sportspeople from Sarasota, Florida
Coaches of American football from Florida
Players of American football from Florida
African-American coaches of American football
African-American players of American football
20th-century African-American sportspeople
21st-century African-American sportspeople